Skaupsjøen is a lake in the municipalities of Eidfjord in Vestland county and Nore og Uvdal in Viken county, Norway. The  lake lies just north of the Hardangervidda National Park on the vast Hardangervidda plateau. The lake outflows to the river Skaupa, which flows into the larger lake Halnefjorden to the northeast.

See also
List of lakes in Norway

References

Lakes of Vestland
Lakes of Viken (county)
Eidfjord
Nore og Uvdal